The Reynard 94I is an open-wheel racing car designed and built by Reynard Racing Cars that competed in the 1994 and 1995 IndyCar seasons, notable for winning the first CART race it entered. The car continued to be raced in the 1996 and 1996-97 Indy Racing League seasons, and holds the unofficial and official lap records at the Indianapolis Motor Speedway.

Development 
The 94I project began in November 1992 with designer Malcolm Oastler. The car was intended to be "simple but soundly engineered, easy to tune and maintain, and with a highly developed aerodynamic package." An unused design for the Galmer G93 had been sold to Reynard and used as a basis for the 94I. Bruce Ashmore, a former designer at Lola Cars, arrived late in the design process as the technical director, and provided input based on his experience with Indy cars.

The car featured elements from the company's F3000 cars, such as dynamic suspension shocks and a longitudinal gearbox (as opposed to the transverse gearbox seen on the rival Lola and Penske cars). Reynard also differentiated themselves by opening a technical base in Indianapolis and making its office and service staff accessible to customers, whereas the other manufacturers were still predominately located in England.

A total of 14 cars were built for the 1994 season at the company's location in Bicester, England.

Racing history 
During the 1994 season, the 94I was raced by Chip Ganassi Racing, Hayhoe Racing, Hall Racing, Galles Racing and Forsythe-Green Racing, and powered by the Ford-Cosworth XB and Ilmor/D engines. An additional 94I was raced at the 1994 Indianapolis 500 by Hemelgarn Racing. The car proved immediately competitive as Ganassi driver Michael Andretti won the first race of the season, held at Surfers Paradise, having started from 2nd place on the grid. Andretti would win again at Toronto later that year. Jacques Villeneuve, in his rookie season, also took his first win for Forsythe-Green at Road America. Despite these results, the teams noted that the 94I was too pitch-sensitive, which would be rectified in the following year's 95I.

The 94I continued to be used by smaller teams in 1995, one of its appeal being that the tub is the same as the 95I and the chassis could be updated to 1995 specifications. During the 1995 season, the 94I were used by Project Indy, Arciero-Wells, Pagan Racing and occasionally by Ganassi Racing. The 94I was also used by Stefan Johansson to qualify for the 1995 Indianapolis 500, when it became evident that his primary Penske chassis had trouble getting up to speed.

For 1996, the car saw competition in the first year of the Indy Racing League (comprising the 1996 season and the first portion of the 1996-97 season) as the league allowed all Indy cars that complied with the 1995 technical regulations. Hence, the grid featured multiple examples of the 94I chassis, mostly from Hemelgarn, Pagan and Treadway Racing (which was formed in conjunction with Project Indy). With engineer Tim Wardrop, Treadway Racing set up Arie Luyendyk's 94I to great effect; Luyendyk went on to set an all-time unofficial lap record of 239.260 mph at Indianapolis, a 1-lap record of 237.498 mph and a 4-lap record of 236.986 mph, all of which still stand as of the present day. The 94I ended the year with a pole and win at Phoenix and pole position at Las Vegas, both achieved by Luyendyk.

Complete Indy Car World Series results
(key) (Results in bold indicate pole position; results in italics indicate fastest lap) 

 2 points were scored with the Reynard 94I. The remaining points were scored with a Reynard 95I.
 No points were scored with the Reynard 94I, which only ran at Indy. All points were scored with a Penske PC23
 No points were scored with the Reynard 94I. All points were scored with a Reynard 95I.
 No points were scored with the Reynard 94I. Danner scored 6 points with a Lola T93/00.

Complete Indy Racing League results
(key) (Results in bold indicate pole position; results in italics indicate fastest lap) 

 Points include results scored with another chassis.

References

Indianapolis 500
American Championship racing cars
Reynard Motorsport vehicles